The 2017–18 Gonzaga Bulldogs men's basketball team represented Gonzaga University in the 2017–18 NCAA Division I men's basketball season. The team was led by head coach Mark Few, who was in his 19th season as head coach. The team played its home games at McCarthey Athletic Center in Spokane, Washington. This was the Bulldogs (also informally referred to as the Zags) 38th season as a member of the West Coast Conference. They finished the season 32–5, 17–1 in WCC play to win the WCC regular season championship. They defeated Loyola Marymount, San Francisco and BYU to become champions of the WCC tournament. They received the WCC's automatic bid to the NCAA tournament where they defeated UNC Greensboro and Ohio State to advance to the Sweet Sixteen where they lost to Florida State.

The last weeks of the season were played against the backdrop of a potential Gonzaga move to the Mountain West Conference (MW), first publicly reported by the San Diego Union-Tribune on February 28, 2018. MW commissioner Craig Thompson told the newspaper that the league had discussed expansion with six schools, with Gonzaga the only school he specifically named. Thompson added that Gonzaga could potentially join as a full but non-football member as early as the 2018–19 school year. A later Union-Tribune report indicated that talks were advanced enough that the conference's presidents planned a vote on an invitation to Gonzaga during the MW men's and women's basketball tournaments in Las Vegas, but decided to delay the vote until after the Final Four. However, before the MW's planned vote, Gonzaga athletic director Mike Roth notified both conferences that Gonzaga would remain in the WCC for the immediate future.

Previous season

The Bulldogs team finished the 2016–17 season 37–2, 17–1 in WCC play. The season was arguably the greatest season in Gonzaga's 109-year basketball history. The Bulldogs finished with a 32–1 regular season record and did not lose a game until February. They finished ranked second in the final AP Poll, the highest final national ranking in school history. They won both the WCC regular season and tournament championships. As a result, they received the conference's automatic bid to the NCAA Tournament and a received a No. 1 seed in the West region. They advanced to the first NCAA National Championship game in the school's history—the deepest run for a WCC team since San Francisco advanced to its third consecutive Final Four in 1957, and also the deepest run by any Division I school without a football team since Seton Hall made the championship game in 1989. With a victory over South Carolina in the national semifinal, the Bulldogs tied the NCAA Division I record for the second-most wins in a season. Their run ended in the NCAA National Championship game, where they lost to North Carolina.

Offseason

Coaching changes

Departures

Additions to staff

Player departures
Johnathan Williams had entered the NBA draft but did not hire an agent, giving him the option to return to Gonzaga. He withdrew from the draft on May 24, the last day he could have done so to retain NCAA eligibility.

Incoming transfers

2017 recruiting class

2017 returning missionaries
Jesse Wade graduated high school in 2015, but before enrolling in college at Gonzaga, he left for a 2-year LDS mission in Lyon, France, and will arrive on campus as a freshman in Fall 2017.

Future recruits

Recruiting class of 2018

Roster
 Roster is subject to change as/if players transfer or leave the program for other reasons.

Coaching staff

Schedule and results

Gonzaga's non-conference schedule includes matchups with Washington and San Diego State on the road. Gonzaga hosted Creighton, Texas Southern, and Incarnate Word at home. Gonzaga battled Villanova on a neutral court at Madison Square Garden in the Jimmy V Classic. The Zags were invited to play in the PK80: Phil Knight Invitational, where they played against Florida, Ohio State, and Texas. The Zags played in the single-elimination WCC Tournament, which took place in March 2018 at the Orleans Arena in Las Vegas.

|-
!colspan=12 style=| Exhibition

|-
!colspan=12 style=| Non-conference regular season

|-
!colspan=12 style=|  WCC Regular Season

|-
!colspan=12 style=| WCC Tournament

|-
!colspan=12 style=| NCAA tournament

Rankings

^Coaches did not release a Week 2 poll.
*AP does not release post-NCAA tournament rankings

Notes

References

Gonzaga Bulldogs men's basketball seasons
Gonzaga
Gonzaga Bulldogs men's basketball
Gonzaga Bulldogs men's basketball
Gonzaga